Denis O'Neil (born 11 February 1936) is a sailor from Australia.  O'Neil represented his country at the 1972 Summer Olympics in Kiel. O'Neil took 16th place in the Soling with Robert Miller as helmsman and Ken Berkeley as fellow crew member. In 1975, O'Neil was part of the winning Soling team in the North American Championship and that same year, won the pre Olympic Regatta at Kingston. At the 1976 Montreal Olympics, he crewed in the Australian boat which finished eleventh in the soling class.

References

1936 births
Living people
Australian male sailors (sport)
North American Champions Soling
Olympic sailors of Australia
Sailors at the 1972 Summer Olympics – Soling
Sailors at the 1976 Summer Olympics – Soling
20th-century Australian people